Pajualuse is a village in Jõhvi Parish, Ida-Viru County in northeastern Estonia. The entrance of the Viru oil shale mine is located south, in Kalina village. As of 2011 Census, Pajualuse's population was 50.

References

Villages in Ida-Viru County